Zhang Xiaoming (born 3 September 1963) is a Chinese politician. He was the director of the Liaison Office of the Central People's Government in Hong Kong and then of the Hong Kong and Macau Affairs Office, before being demoted to deputy director of the latter due to the 2019–2020 Hong Kong protests.

Early life
Zhang was born in Taizhou, Jiangsu in September 1963.  He graduated from Southwest University of Political Science & Law and Renmin University of China in 1984, where he majored in law. He studied under Gao Mingxuan, who is a famous jurist in China. Zhang received an LLM from Renmin University of China in 1986.

Party politician
In 1986, Zhang was assigned to Hong Kong and Macau Affairs Office as a secretary for Liao Hui. On 18 December 2012, Zhang started serving as director of the Liaison Office of the Central People's Government in the Hong Kong Special Administrative Region and spearheaded the CCP's efforts against the democratic movement in the former British colony.  In a widely reported incident he stated to pro-democratic legislative council member Leung Yiu-chung that "the fact that you are allowed to stay alive already shows the country's inclusiveness".

In September 2015, Zhang stirred controversy in Hong Kong after claiming that the Chief Executive of Hong Kong had a "special legal position which overrides administrative, legislative and judicial organs" and that separation of powers is "not suitable for Hong Kong". Chief Executive Leung Chun-ying subsequently affirmed that his position is "transcendent" of the branches of the state.

He continued as director of the Liaison Office till 2017, when he was promoted to director of the Hong Kong and Macau Affairs Office. He was demoted, in February 2020, during the widespread anti-government protests and the COVID-19 pandemic affecting Hong Kong, to a deputy directorship of that office. Zhang is an alternate member of the 18th Central Committee of the Chinese Communist Party.

In November 2020, following the expulsion of 4 pro-democracy lawmakers from the Legislative Council, Zhang said "Hong Kong’s administrators must be patriots... and people who are anti-China and cause trouble in Hong Kong must be kicked out. This is a political rule under 'one country, two systems', and has become a legal requirement now."

Also in November 2020, Zhang called for judicial reforms in Hong Kong. In January 2021, Chief Justice Geoffrey Ma responded and said that the judiciary should not be reformed simply due to the pro-Beijing party being unhappy with the court's rulings.

In March 2021, while on a trip to Hong Kong to survey opinions about planned changes to the electoral system to implement "patriots" ruling the government, Zhang claimed that he met with pan-democrats, without specifically naming any.

US sanctions

In August 2020, Zhang and ten other officials were sanctioned by the United States Department of the Treasury under Executive Order 13936 by United States President Donald Trump for undermining Hong Kong's autonomy.

On October 14, 2020, the United States Department of State released a report on 10 individuals who materially contributed to the failure of China to meet its obligations under the Sino–British Joint Declaration and Hong Kong's Basic Law. Zhang was on the list.

References 

1963 births
People from Taizhou, Jiangsu
Members of the 19th Central Committee of the Chinese Communist Party
Alternate members of the 18th Central Committee of the Chinese Communist Party
Delegates to the 12th National People's Congress
Delegates to the 11th National People's Congress
Southwest University of Political Science & Law alumni
Renmin University of China alumni
Living people
Individuals sanctioned by the United States under the Hong Kong Autonomy Act
Chinese individuals subject to U.S. Department of the Treasury sanctions